Yevgeny Romanovich Grishin (23 March 1931 – 9 July 2005) was a Soviet and Russian speedskater. Grishin trained for the largest part of his speedskating career at CSKA Moscow. He became European Champion in 1956, and won Olympic gold in the 500 meter and 1500 meter events in both 1956 and 1960 Winter Olympics (sharing the 1500 meter victories with respectively Yuri Mikhaylov and Roald Aas), competing for the USSR team. Along with his compatriot Lidiya Skoblikova, he was the most successful athlete at the 1960 Winter Olympics.

Grishin was the first to break the 40 second barrier on the 500 m, skating 39.6 in an unofficial test race in Squaw Valley in 1960, just after the Winter Olympic Games at the same location. Three years later, on 27–28 January 1963, he set officially ratified world records 39.6 and 39.5 at the Medeu track. He also won 2 bronze medals in the World Championships, in 1954 and 1956. 

He had 12 single distance wins in his 14 starts in allround championships. Over the course of his career Grishin set seven world records; the 1:22.8 time of the 1000 m lasted 12 years.

World records
Over the course of his career, Grishin skated seven world records:

Source: SpeedSkatingStats.com

References

External links
 Yevgeny Grishin at SpeedSkatingStats.com
 Legends of Soviet Sport: Yevgeny Grishin

1931 births
2005 deaths
Sportspeople from Tula, Russia
Russian male speed skaters
Soviet male speed skaters
Olympic speed skaters of the Soviet Union
Speed skaters at the 1956 Winter Olympics
Speed skaters at the 1960 Winter Olympics
Speed skaters at the 1964 Winter Olympics
Speed skaters at the 1968 Winter Olympics
Olympic gold medalists for the Soviet Union
Olympic silver medalists for the Soviet Union
Olympic medalists in speed skating
Medalists at the 1956 Winter Olympics
Medalists at the 1960 Winter Olympics
Medalists at the 1964 Winter Olympics
World Allround Speed Skating Championships medalists
World record setters in speed skating
Communist Party of the Soviet Union members
Honoured Masters of Sport of the USSR
Merited Coaches of the Soviet Union
Recipients of the Order of Lenin
Recipients of the Order of the Red Banner of Labour
Burials in Troyekurovskoye Cemetery